The  Ulster Scots (Ulster-Scots: Ulstèr-Scotch), also called Ulster Scots people (Ulstèr-Scotch fowk) or, in North America, Scotch-Irish (Scotch-Airisch) or Scots-Irish, are an ethnic group in Ireland, who speak an Ulster Scots dialect of the Scots language, a West Germanic language, and share a common history, culture and ancestry. As an ethnicity, they descend largely from Scottish settlers who settled in Northern Ireland in the 17th century.

Found mostly in the province of Ulster, and to a lesser extent in the rest of Ireland, their ancestors were Protestant, mainly Presbyterian, settlers who migrated from the Scottish Lowlands and Northern England during the Plantation of Ulster. The largest numbers came from Dumfries and Galloway, Lanarkshire, Renfrewshire, Ayrshire, Scottish Borders, Northumberland, Cumbria, Yorkshire, and to a much lesser extent, from the Scottish Highlands. Northern Ireland is one of the four countries of the United Kingdom. The majority of people living in Northern Ireland are British and/or Irish citizens.

The Ulster Scots migrated to Ireland in large numbers both as a result of the government-sanctioned Plantation of Ulster, a planned process of colonisation which took place under the auspices of James VI of Scotland and I of England on land confiscated from members of the Gaelic nobility of Ireland who fled Ulster, and as part of a larger migration or unplanned wave of settlement.

Ulster Scots people emigrated from Ireland in significant numbers to the American colonies, later the United States, and elsewhere in the British Empire.  Scotch-Irish (or Scots-Irish) is a traditional term for Ulster Scots who emigrated to America.

History

Early development

The first major influx of border English and Lowland Scots into Ulster came in the first two decades of the 17th century.

First, before the Plantation of Ulster and even before the Flight of the Earls, there was the 1606 independent Scottish settlement in east Down and Antrim. It was led by adventurers James Hamilton and Sir Hugh Montgomery, two Ayrshire lairds. Montgomery was granted half of Lord of Upper Clandeboye Conn McNeill O'Neill,'s land, a significant Gaelic lordship in Ulster, as a reward for helping him escape from English captivity. Hamilton forced himself in on this deal when he discovered it and, after three years of bickering, the final settlement gave Hamilton and Montgomery each one-third of the land.

Starting in 1609, Scots began arriving into state-sponsored settlements as part of the Plantation of Ulster. This scheme was intended to confiscate all the lands of the Gaelic Irish nobility in Ulster and to settle the province with Protestant Scottish and English colonists. Under this scheme, a substantial number of Scots were settled, mostly in the south and west of Ulster, on confiscated land. 

While many of the Scottish planters in Ulster came from southwest Scotland, a large number came from the southeast, including the unstable regions right along the border with England (the Scottish Borders and Northumberland). These groups were from the Borderers or Border Reivers culture, which had familial links on both sides of the Anglo-Scottish border. The plan was that moving these Borderers to Ireland would both solve the Borders problem and tie down Ulster. This was of particular concern to James VI of Scotland when he became King of England, since he knew Scottish instability could jeopardise his chances of ruling both kingdoms effectively.

During the Irish Rebellion of 1641, the native Irish gentry attempted to extirpate the English and Scottish settlers in revenge for being driven off their ancestral land, resulting in severe violence, massacres and ultimately leading to the deaths of between four and six thousand settlers over the winter of 1641–42. Native Irish civilians were massacred in return. By 1642, native Irish were in de facto control of much of the island under a Confederate Ireland, with about a third under the control of the opposition. However, many Ulster-Scots Presbyterians joined with the Irish in rebellion and aided them in driving the English out.

The Ulster-Scottish population in Ireland was quite possibly preserved from complete annihilation during the subsequent Irish Confederate Wars, when a Scottish Covenanter army was landed in the province to protect the Ulster-Scottish settlers from native Irish landowners. The war itself, part of the Wars of the Three Kingdoms, ended in the 1650s, with the Cromwellian conquest of Ireland. At the head of the army, Oliver Cromwell conquered all of Ireland. Defeating the Irish Confederates and English Royalists on behalf of the English Parliamentarians, he and his forces employed methods and inflicted casualties among the civilian Irish population that have long been commonly considered by contemporary sources, historians and the popular culture to be outside of the accepted military ethics of the day (see more on the debate here). After the Cromwellian war in Ireland was over, many of their soldiers settled permanently in eastern Ulster.

Under the Act of Settlement 1652, all Catholic-owned land was confiscated and the British Plantations in Ireland, which had been destroyed by the rebellion of 1641, were restored. However, due to the Scots' enmity to the English Parliament in the final stages of the English Civil War, English settlers rather than Scots were the main beneficiary of this scheme.

There was a generation of calm in Ireland until another war broke out in 1689, again due to political conflict closely aligned with ethnic and religious differences. The Williamite war in Ireland (1689–91) was fought between Jacobites who supported the restoration of the Catholic James II to the throne of England and Williamites who supported the Protestant William of Orange. The majority of the Protestant colonists throughout Ireland but particularly in Ulster, fought on the Williamite side in the war against the Jacobites. The fear of a repeat of the massacres of 1641, fear of retribution for religious persecution, as well as their wish to hold on to lands which had been confiscated from Catholic landowners, were all principal motivating factors.

The Williamite forces, composed of British, Dutch, Huguenot and Danish armies, as well as troops raised in Ulster, ended Jacobite resistance by 1691, confirming the Protestant minority's monopoly on power in Ireland. Their victories at Derry, the Boyne and Aughrim are still commemorated by the Orange Order into the 21st century.

Finally, another major influx of Scots into northern Ireland occurred in the late 1690s, when tens of thousands of people fled a famine in Scotland to come to Ulster.

It was only after the 1690s that Scottish settlers and their descendants, the majority of whom were Presbyterian, gained numeric superiority in Ulster, though still a minority in Ireland as a whole. Along with Catholics, they were legally disadvantaged by the Penal Laws, which gave full rights only to members of the Church of Ireland (the Anglican state church), who were mainly Anglo-Irish (themselves often absentee landlords), native Irish converts or the descendants of English settlers. For this reason, up until the 19th century, there was considerable disharmony between Dissenters and the ruling Protestant Ascendancy in Ireland. With the enforcement of Queen Anne's 1703 Test Act, which caused further discrimination against all who did not participate in the established church, considerable numbers of Ulster-Scots migrated to the colonies in British America throughout the 18th and 19th centuries. In fact, these 'Scots-Irish' from Ulster and Lowland Scotland comprised the most numerous group of immigrants from Great Britain and Ireland to the American colonies in the years prior the American Revolution, with an estimated 150,000 leaving northern Ireland at the time.

Towards the end of the 18th century, many Ulster-Scots Presbyterians ignored religious differences and, along with many Catholic Gaelic Irish, joined the United Irishmen to participate in the Irish Rebellion of 1798 in support of republican and egalitarian ideals.

Scotch-Irish

Just a few generations after arriving in Ulster, considerable numbers of Ulster-Scots emigrated to the North American colonies of Great Britain. Between 1717 and 1775, an estimated 200,000 migrated to what became the United States of America. Around the same time, the British took control of the territory of New France, allowing many Ulster-Scots to migrate to these areas as well. These people are known as the Scotch-Irish Canadians.

In the United States Census of 2000, 4.3 million Americans (1.5% of the population of the United States) claimed Scotch-Irish ancestry. Author and former United States Senator Jim Webb suggests that the true number of people with some Scots-Irish heritage in the United States is more—over 27 million—possibly because contemporary Americans with some Scotch-Irish heritage may regard themselves as either Irish, Scottish, or simply American instead.

Culture

Over the centuries, Ulster Scots culture has contributed to the unique character of the counties in Northern Ireland. The Ulster Scots Agency points to industry, language, music, sport, religion and myriad traditions brought to Ulster from the Scottish lowlands. In particular, the origin of country and Western music was extensively from Ulster Scots folk music, in addition to English, German, and African-American styles.

The cultural traditions and aspects of this culture including its links to country music are articulated in David Hackett Fischer's book, Albion's Seed: Four British Folkways in America. In 2010's documentary The Hamely Tongue, filmmaker Deaglán O Mocháin traces back the origins of this culture and language, and relates its manifestations in today's Ireland. The film's title refers to James Fenton's book, The Hamely Tongue: A personal record of Ulster-Scots in County Antrim.

Most Ulster Scots speak Ulster English as a first language. Ulster Scots is the local dialect of the Lowland Scots language which has, since the 1980s, also been called "Ullans", a portmanteau neologism popularised by the physician, amateur historian and politician Dr Ian Adamson, merging Ulster and Lallans—the Scots for "Lowlands" —but also an acronym for "Ulster-Scots language in literature and native speech".

Hereditary disease
The North American ancestry of the X-linked form of the genetic disease congenital nephrogenic diabetes insipidus has been traced to Ulster Scots who travelled to Nova Scotia in 1761 on the ship Hopewell.

See also

 Anglo-Irish people
 British Americans
 History of Northern Ireland
 History of Scotland
 Immigration to the United States
 Irish Catholic
 Orange Order
 Plantation of Ulster
 Presbyterian Church in Ireland
 Republic of Ireland
 Scotch-Irish Americans
 Society of United Irishmen
 Ulster
 Ulster Covenant
 Ulster loyalism
 Ulster Protestants
 Ulster-Scots Agency
 Ulster Scots dialects
 Unionism (Ireland)
 William III of England

References

External links
 Ulster-Scots Academy
 Ulster-Scots Agency
 The Ulster-Scots Society of America
 BBC Ulster-Scots—culture and language portal
 The Scot in Ulster: Sketch of the History of the Scottish Population in Ulster (by John Harrison, 1888)
 Inconvenient Peripheries Ethnic Identity and the United Kingdom Estate The cases of "Protestant Ulster" and 'Cornwall’ by Prof Philip Payton
 The Scots in Ulster and the Colonial "Enterprise" of Walter Devereux, Earl of Essex, 1573-1575 at University of Glasgow

 
Ethnic groups in Ireland
Ethnic groups in Northern Ireland
Scottish diaspora in Europe